Alexander Duncan (24 February 1884 – 21 January 1959) was a British long-distance runner. He competed in the men's marathon at the 1908 Summer Olympics.

References

1884 births
1959 deaths
Athletes (track and field) at the 1908 Summer Olympics
British male long-distance runners
British male marathon runners
Olympic athletes of Great Britain
Sportspeople from Kendal